The following are lists of members of the Indiana Supreme Court. Founded in 1816 with the ratification of the Constitution of Indiana, the court's size has varied between three and five members serving at the same time.

Supreme Court justices in 2022

Appointment of justices
From 1816 until 1851 justices served seven-year terms and were appointed by the governor and confirmed by the Indiana Senate. From 1851 until 1971 justices were elected by popular vote every six years. From 1971 to the present a pool of candidates is selected by the Indiana Judicial Nominating Commission and one is appointed by the governor. Justices are subject to a retention election after two years of service and, if retained, they may continue for a full term of ten years.

Previous Supreme Court justices

† – There is a dispute between sources on Judge Olds' education. Gugin & St. Clair, Justices of the Indiana Supreme Court at 149 (2010) states, "Olds attended Capital University in Columbus, Ohio, and then read law with his brother, James." Browning, Humphrey, & Kleinschmidt. "Biographical Sketches of Indiana Supreme Court Justices," 30 Ind. Law Review 328, 367 (1997) states, "He studied law at The Ohio State University."

Justices by school

Undergraduate and masters degrees

Masters of Laws (LL.M.) and Doctor of Juridicial Science (S.J.D.)

Notes

See also

Indiana Supreme Court

References
 Gugin, Linda C., and James E. St. Clair. Justices of the Indiana Supreme Court. Indianapolis: Indiana Historical Society Press 2011. .  WorldCat
 Browning, Minde C., Richard Humphrey, and Bruce Kleinschmidt. "Biographical Sketches of Indiana Supreme Court Justices." Indiana Law Review: Vol. 30, No. 1, 1997.

External links
Indiana Supreme Court Justices

 
Supreme Court justices
Indiana